Kavich (also Romanized as Kavīch) is a village in Qarah Su Rural District, Meshgin-e Sharqi District, Meshgin Shahr County, Ardabil Province, Iran. At the 2006 census, its population was 569, in 151 families.

References 

Tageo

Towns and villages in Meshgin Shahr County